"Blue Jeans" is a song by Australian band Skyhooks, released in August 1976 as the third and final single from the band's third studio album, Straight in a Gay Gay World. The song peaked at number 12 in Australia and at number three in New Zealand.

Details
Author Macainsh said, "Blue Jeans is more of what you'd call social comment. We used to do it when we first started. Ross Wilson has always tried to get it recorded, but we've never been real keen on the idea til we got stuck for a song on this album. We wanted a couple of laidback tunes to round it off rather than have an album of ravers and up stuff. So we tried it and it came out well."

Being an older song, Wilson's Doo Dah Music owned the publishing. Singer Shirley Strachan accused producer Wilson of wanting the song included for his own profit, asking him, "So why do you get so much money? You're not even in the band."

Track listing
7" single (K-6542)
 Side A "Blue Jeans" - 2:30
 Side B "Mumbo Jumbo" - 3:20

Charts

Weekly charts

Year-end charts

References 

1976 singles
Mushroom Records singles
1976 songs
Songs written by Greg Macainsh
Skyhooks (band) songs